Sneakin' Sally Through the Alley is the debut solo album by Robert Palmer, released in 1974. It was his first effort after three album releases co-fronting the band Vinegar Joe.

Palmer is backed by The Meters and Lowell George of Little Feat. Multiple reviewers have commented that Palmer sang confidently on this album, despite being backed by more accomplished musicians such as Lowell George, Art Neville and New Orleans singer-songwriter Allen Toussaint.

The album peaked at No. 107 in the Billboard 200. "Get Outside", which was released as the B-side to "Which of Us Is the Fool", a single from Palmer's next album Pressure Drop, bubbled under the Billboard Hot 100, peaking at No. 105. Neither the album nor its singles charted in the UK however.

Songs
While most of the songs on the album were originals, the album also contained a few covers:
 The title track was originally sung by Lee Dorsey, and was included on his 1971 album Yes We Can. Ringo Starr covered it for his 1977 album Ringo the 4th. In 2011 it was used in the video game Driver: San Francisco.
 "Sailin' Shoes" was written by Lowell George, and originally performed by Little Feat. It was initially recorded on their 1972 album of the same title.
 "From a Whisper to a Scream" was written and originally performed by Allen Toussaint on his 1971 album Toussaint.

Track listing
All tracks are written by Robert Palmer,  except where noted.

Personnel
Per sleeve notes

Musicians
Robert Palmer – vocals (all tracks), backing vocals (1–3, 8), guitar (8), bass guitar (2), percussion (2), marimba (2) 
Vicki Brown – backing vocals (1, 2, 4)
Mel Collins – horns (4, 8)
Mongezi - flageolet (6), horns (8)
Jack Vance – strings (8)
Lowell George – guitar (1, 3, 4, 6, 7)
Jim Mullen – guitar (2)
Richard Parfitt – guitar (5)
Chris Stainton – acoustic piano (7)
Steve Winwood – acoustic piano (8)
Onaje – electric piano (8)
Jody Linscott – percussion (2, 3, 6)
Gasper Lawal – percussion (4, 8)
Steve York – harmonica (3)
The Meters (1, 3, 6, 7)
Art Neville – keyboards
Leo Nocentelli – guitar
George Porter Jr. – bass guitar
Ziggy Modeliste – drums
New York Rhythm Section (4, 5, 8)
Richard Tee – keyboards
Cornell Dupree – guitar
Gordon Edwards – bass guitar
Bernard Purdie – drums

Production
Producer: Steve Smith 
Engineer: Phill Brown, Ken Laxton, Alan Varner, Rhett Davies
Photography: Graham Hughes

See also
 List of albums released in 1974

References

http://www.robertpalmer.com/sneaking_sally.html

Robert Palmer (singer) albums
1974 debut albums
Island Records albums